Dianne Kay is a retired American actress. She is best known for playing 4th daughter Nancy Bradford on ABC's Eight Is Enough from 1977 to 1981.

Career
Born in Phoenix, Arizona to Peter and Miriam Kay, Dianne Kay had a large role in Steven Spielberg's period comedy film 1941 (1979). Kay had a regular role as Richard Mulligan's daughter on the short-lived ABC sitcom Reggie in 1983. She later appeared in the Eight is Enough reunion television movies in 1987 and 1989. She appeared on the pilot episode of Flamingo Road, and was a regular on the short-lived series Glitter. Her last appearance was on a 1999 episode of Dick Van Dyke's detective series Diagnosis: Murder, as the unwitting wife of a serial killer.

Filmography

References

External links
 

Living people
American film actresses
American television actresses
20th-century American actresses
Actresses from Phoenix, Arizona
21st-century American women
Year of birth missing (living people)